Donald F. Ungurait (1936-2013) was the founding Dean of the Florida State University (FSU) Film School., and has directed more than 50 plays, musicals and operas and received more than 200 producer-director credits.

Ungurait received his BA at Indiana State University and MA and PhD at the University of Wisconsin–Madison.  He joined the FSU faculty in 1968 and retired as associate professor of communication in 2003.

Beginning in the fall 1968 quarter, Ungurait taught Introduction to Mass Communication and later expanded his course offerings to History of the Film, parts I and II, Cinema as a Social Force, a radio production class, writing for broadcasting and supervised a number of his students in Individual Directed Studies. He conducted research into public opinions of the film rating system, using student assistants to call thousands of Floridians. His experience working with a major Chicago advertising firm was reflected in his insistence that students make the link between academics and real world situations.  His mantra was that the students should never lose sight of the fact that they would be in business to "make money".  In one class, Economic Support of the Mass Media, students were asked to find a Black candidate to run for mayor of Tallahassee and to create a credible marketing campaign using a mix of media. This class was very competitive, with students formed into groups who completed projects and were awarded letter grades based on the group's performance. The top group received the "A", the next highest group received the "B" and so on.

Ungurait's love of film was reflected in his weekly double-feature screenings going back to the earliest days of movie-making.

The Association of Independent Commercial Producers recognized him as the Film Educator of the Decade in 1990.  Florida State has twice recognized him with the Seminole Award for Leadership and Service, and once with the Provost's Award for Excellence in Undergraduate Instruction.

References

External links
Exploring FSU's Past: A Public History Project, Fall 2006  

2013 deaths
Florida State University faculty
Indiana State University alumni
University of Wisconsin–Madison alumni
1936 births